Wilker José Ángel Romero (born 18 March 1993) is a Venezuelan professional footballer who plays as a centre-back for the Venezuela national team and Aucas.

Career

Club

Trujillanos FC
Before he was 18, Angel won the Primera División with Trujillanos FC in the 2010-2011 season,

Deportivo Táchira
Angel moved to Deportivo Táchira in 2011 and scored his first goal against Caroni in a match they lost 2-1 on 5 March 2011, his second came 11 days later against Estudiantes de Mérida winning the match 3-1, his third goal came against Zulia FC on 20 May 2012, his team won 5-0.

Terek Grozny
On 1 August 2016, Ángel signed for Russian Premier League side Akhmat Grozny, then called Terek Grozny. 
On 17 May 2021, Akhmat Grozny announced that Ángel had left the club after 121 games for the club.

Göztepe
On 8 September 2021, he signed a one-year contract with one-year option with the Turkish club Göztepe.

International
Ángel was called up to the full Venezuela squad for the 2014 FIFA World Cup qualifiers, but was not included. On 18 November 2014, he made his debut in a friendly against Bolivia, where he scored the opening goal of the match. However, despite this, Venezuela lost 2–3.

Career statistics

Club

International

Statistics accurate as of match played 03 June 2021

International goals

Honors

National
Venezuela
Kirin Cup: 2019

References

External links
 Goalface.com 

1993 births
Living people
People from Valera
Venezuelan footballers
Association football defenders
Venezuela international footballers
Trujillanos FC players
Deportivo Táchira F.C. players
Venezuela under-20 international footballers
2015 Copa América players
Copa América Centenario players
FC Akhmat Grozny players
Göztepe S.K. footballers
Venezuelan expatriate footballers
Expatriate footballers in Russia
Venezuelan expatriate sportspeople in Russia
Expatriate footballers in Turkey
Venezuelan expatriate sportspeople in Turkey
Venezuelan Primera División players
Russian Premier League players
Süper Lig players